Bruno Agostinelli Jr. (1 April 1987 – 9 March 2016) was a Canadian Davis Cup tennis player.

See also
List of Canada Davis Cup team representatives

References

External links
 
 
 

1987 births
2016 deaths
Canadian male tennis players
Motorcycle road incident deaths
Road incident deaths in Canada
Accidental deaths in Ontario
Sportspeople from Niagara Falls, Ontario
Racket sportspeople from Ontario